The 1991 Penn Quakers football team represented the University of Pennsylvania in the 1991 NCAA Division I-AA football season.

Schedule

References

Penn
Penn Quakers football seasons
Penn Quakers football